INPEX (Invention and New Product Exposition) is America's largest invention trade show, held since 1985 and organized by the invention promotion firm InventHelp. The annual show is held each June in Pittsburgh, Pennsylvania.

INPEX provides a forum for inventors to exhibit their inventions and pitch their ideas with companies interested in licensing, marketing or manufacturing their new products.

This trade show also hosts contests for domestic and international inventors (45 different categories), as well as seminars and workshops for both inventors and business attendees within the George Foreman Inventors University. The annual sponsor and producer of INPEX, InventHelp, markets promotional services to amateur inventors.

Inventions at INPEX range from simple products to highly technical devices that can be displayed as models or prototypes or as a finished product for the mass market.

History
INPEX has always been held in Pittsburgh. The first trade show took place in 1982. 2015 was the 30th anniversary of the event.

Show highlights

2014
The show was held from June 18–20 with such keynote speakers as George Foreman, a retired American professional boxer, who is now engaged in entrepreneurship activity; and Maxine Clark, the founder of Build-A-Bear Workshop.

About 300 inventors were competing for medals in 40 categories, with inventors from the Philippines, Spain, Taiwan and Qatar. About 1000 business and marketing companies were named as potential visitors of this year’s show.

2015 
The show was held at the Monroeville Convention Center from June 16–18 with keynote speakers including AJ Khubani, the CEO and President of TeleBrands Corporation, a company well known for “As Seen on TV” products.

About 275 inventors pitched their ideas and were eligible for medals in 45 categories. The show had contests for domestic and international inventors, including from the Philippines, Spain, Taiwan, and Korea. About 800 business and marketing companies were named as potential visitors of this year’s show.

2016 
The 2016 edition of InventHelp’s INPEX was held from June 7 to June 9, 2016 and featured over 1,000 inventions from over 20 countries. The event was again headlined by the entrepreneur and former boxer George Foreman. The event was also attended by other conveners such as QVC, Brookstone, Cuisinart, Partsmaster, Allstar Products Group, Schroeder and Tremayne, Inc. The event allowed hundreds of inventors to showcase their inventions and new products in an effort to attract investors and partners.

The event allowed numerous inventors to showcase their inventions and products in an effort to attract investors and partners.

Larry Carswell took home the Grand Prix award for the "Mudder"; the world’s first cable-free ATV/UTV paddle winch.

See also

 Invention
 List of inventors
 National Inventors Hall of Fame
 Patent model
 TRIZ approach

References

External links
 
 InventHelp's INPEX Trade Show

Trade shows in the United States
Technology conferences
1984 establishments in Pennsylvania
Recurring events established in 1984